Roberto Julián Duranona (born December 8, 1965 in Cuba is a Cuban-Icelandic former handball player. His demarcation on the field was left backcourt.

Duranona participated with the Cuba men's national handball team on the World Men's Handball Championship in 1986, where his team finished 15th out of 16, but with 50 goals he finished second on the top goalscorers list behind Jae-Won Kang of Korea. Four years later in 1990, Cuba finished 14th out of 16, but Duranona became the top scorer of the tournament with 55 goals, tied with Aleksandr Tuchkin of the Soviet Union. He gained all together 270 caps in the Cuban national team.

In 1994 Duranona went to Argentina to complete his degree in physical education. In 1995 he moved to play for KA Akureyri in Iceland, where he also got the citizenship, and played 61 times for the Iceland men's national handball team, scoring 202 goals. In 1997 he changed to ThSV Eisenach in Germany, where he scored 426 goals in three seasons. In 2000 he moved to TuS Nettelstedt, from where in 2002 he switched to HSG Wetzlar. His last known team was Castellón in Spain where he moved in 2006.

He was 202 cm high, weighed 110 kg, and wore size 51 shoes.

References

External links
Gegnerkader TuS Nettelstedt Saison 2000/2001

1965 births
Cuban male handball players
Icelandic male handball players
HSG Wetzlar players
Living people
Icelandic people of Cuban descent
Knattspyrnufélag Akureyrar handball players